The Rowan County Regiment was originally established in about August 1, 1775 as a local militia in Rowan County in the Province of North-Carolina.  When the North Carolina Provincial Congress authorized thirty-five existing county militias to be organized on September 9, 1775, the Rowan County Regiment was included and all officers were appointed with commissions from the Provincial Congress.  The members of the Rowan County Regiment were mostly from what was Rowan County at the time.  Prior to establishment of the Rowan County Regiment, many of its officers were active in the Rowan County Committee of Safety.  The regiment included 160 known companies and one or more of these companies were engaged in 36 known battles or skirmishes during the American Revolution.  After the establishment of the Rowan County Regiment, several other counties were created from Rowan County, including Burke County in 1777, Iredell County in 1788, Davidson County in 1822 and Davie County in 1836.

History
Prior to the American Revolution, Rowan County had a colonial militia when part of the Province of North Carolina.  The Rowan County militia was used to defend the settlers during the Anglo-Cherokee War of 1758 to 1761 when the Cherokee Indians were devastating the outlying settlements.  The Rowan County Regiment may have been the militia unit commanded by Hugh Waddell from Fort Dobbs built in 17551758.  From mid-May to mid-June 1767, Waddell commanded Rowan and Mecklenburg militia detachments accompanying Governor Tryon to establish a boundary between North Carolina and the Cherokee. In 1768, the regiment was commanded by Colonel Alexander Osborne.  Colonel Osborne marched with the Rowan County regiment to assist Governor William Tryon in suppressing the Regulator Movement at Hillsborough in 1768 on the Yadkin River above Salisbury.  (The Rowan County Scots-Irish did not join the Regulator Movement.)  Colonel Osborn (17061776) was the father of Adlai Osborne, who would later command the 2nd Rowan County Regiment during the American Revolution. 

As a lead up to the American Revolution, the Rowan County Regiment was established on about August 1, 1775 under patriot command.   Most of the regimental leadership were participants in the Rowan County Committee of Safety.  The North Carolina Provincial Congress authorized the Rowan County Regiment to be organized as one of the 35 existing county militias on September 9, 1775.  Colonel Griffith Rutherford became its first commander.  Shortly after being authorized, the regiment was split on October 22, 1775, into two separate and distinct regiments—the 1st Rowan County Regiment and the 2nd Rowan County Regiment. The 1st Rowan County Regiment retained most of the original members of the original Rowan County Regiment. When the Salisbury District Brigade was created on May 4, 1776, the Rowan County Regiment was included in this Brigade and Col Rutherford assumed command of the Brigade.  On May 9, 1777, the 2nd Rowan County Regiment was renamed as the Burke County Regiment, and the 1st Rowan County Regiment reverted to its original name—the Rowan County Regiment.  On May 1, 1782, this Regiment was once again split into two separate and distinct regiments—the 1st Rowan County Regiment and the 2nd Rowan County Regiment. These two separate regiments continued until the end of the war (September 3, 1783).

Officers
The following listings show the known commanders, officers, staff, and soldiers of the Rowan County Regiment.   Col Rutherford left the Rowan County Regiment when he was promoted to brigadier general in charge of the 1st Salisbury District Minutemen and later the Salisbury District Brigade.

Commandants and colonels:
Colonel Alexander Osborne (commander prior to 1775)
Colonel Griffith Rutherford (commandant, original officer) (Sep 9, 1775 to Dec 21, 1775)
Colonel Matthew Locke (1775–1783, 2nd colonel, brother of Francis Locke)  
Colonel Francis Locke, Sr. (original officer) (commandant, December 21, 1775November 13, 1776; April 10, 17771783) 
Colonel Hugh Montgomery (commandant, November 23, 1776April 10, 1777)

The regiment consisted of 160 known companies headed by captains.  Company officers included lieutenants, ensigns, sergeants, corporals, and privates/drummers/fifers.  The following are the known notable captains and subordinates:
 Lieutenant William Richardson Davie, 10th Governor of North Carolina (17981799)
 Captain William Sharpe, delegate to the Continental Congress (17791781)
 Captain Joseph Dickson, Congressman from North Carolina (17991801)and Tennessee (18071811)

Engagements
The Rowan County Regiment was involved in 31 known engagements during the American Revolution from 1775 to 1782.   They fought in Georgia, North Carolina, and South Carolina.   The battle of Torrence's Tavern was the only battle fought in what became Iredell County, North Carolina in 1788, where many of the regiment's soldiers resided after the war. Companies were headed by captains.  Not every company took part in every engagement.  The regiment was also responsible for manning a shoe factory near what is now Statesville, North Carolina.  The known engagements included:

See also
 Cherokee–American wars
 Fort Dobbs
 List of American Revolutionary War battles
 Salisbury District Brigade
 Southern Campaigns: Pension Transactions for a description of the transcription effort by Will Graves
 Southern theater of the American Revolutionary War

References

Further reading

External links
 

North Carolina militia
Rowan County, North Carolina
1775 establishments in North Carolina
Military units and formations established in 1775
Military units and formations disestablished in 1783
1775 in North Carolina